Galapagos 3D is a British nature documentary series written and presented by David Attenborough, directed by Martin Williams and filmed in 3D. Attenborough returns to the Galápagos Islands for the fourth time in his career and travels throughout the archipelago to explain their origins and their unique fauna in evolutionary terms.

The series premiered on 1 January 2013 on the Sky 3D network in the UK. A 2D version retitled Galapagos with David Attenborough was simulcast on Sky One, attracting 563,000 viewers.  The making of the series was documented in the accompanying programme Making Attenborough's Galapagos.

Galapagos 3D is Attenborough's second 3D television series following 2012's Kingdom of Plants 3D, and his fourth 3D project for Sky television after the earlier one-off documentaries Flying Monsters 3D and The Bachelor King 3D. In common with its predecessors, Galapagos 3D was produced by Colossus Productions, a partnership between Atlantic Productions and Sky.

The series is notable for its pioneering use of 3D cameras for underwater filming. It also features the first known footage of the Galápagos pink land iguana, a new species of lizard identified in 2009,  and Attenborough's encounter with Lonesome George, the last Pinta Island tortoise, filmed a fortnight before the animal's death.

In 2013 Attenborough narrated Sky 3D's next natural history series on invertebrates, Micro Monsters 3D.

Episodes

References

External links
 Official Sky website for Galapagos 3D

Further reading
 Galapagos 3D - a precedent setting 3D documentary?

3D television shows
Documentary films about nature
2013 British television series debuts
2013 British television series endings
British documentary television series
Films set on the Galápagos Islands